John Cotton Smith (February 12, 1765 – December 7, 1845) was an American lawyer, judge and politician from Connecticut. He served as a member of the United States House of Representatives, as the 27th Lieutenant Governor of Connecticut and as the 23rd Governor of Connecticut.

Biography
Smith was born in Sharon in the Connecticut Colony, the son of Cotton Mather Smith, a Puritan minister who moved from Massachusetts to Connecticut. Smith completed preparatory studies and graduated from Yale College in 1783. After graduation, he studied law and was  admitted to the bar. He began the practice of law in Sharon in 1787. Smith married Margaret Evertson and they had one son together.

He entered politics as a member of the Connecticut House of Representatives in 1793. He served in the State House in 1793, 1796 and 1800. In 1800 he served as speaker of that body.

Smith was elected as a Federalist candidate to the Sixth Congress to fill the vacancy caused by the resignation of Jonathan Brace. He was reelected to the Seventh, Eighth and Ninth Congresses, serving from November 17, 1800 until his resignation in August 1806. Smith was chairman of the Committee on Claims in the Seventh through Ninth Congresses.

After serving in Congress, Smith served as an associate judge of the Superior Court and Supreme Court of Errors from 1809 to 1811. He served as the 27th Lieutenant Governor of Connecticut from 1811 to 1812. He was the 23rd Governor of Connecticut from October 25, 1812 to May 8, 1817. Smith was an unsuccessful candidate for Governor on the Federalist ticket in 1817. He was the last Federalist Governor of Connecticut.

Smith retired from politics but remained involved in academic and religious organizations. He was a member of the Massachusetts Historical Society, the Connecticut Historical Society, and was elected a member of the American Antiquarian Society in 1813. He served as president of the American Bible Society from 1831 until his death in 1845. Smith died on December 7, 1845 in Sharon. He is interred in Hillside Cemetery.

Smith's home in Sharon is listed on the National Register of Historic Places.

References

External links
 
 Biographical Directory of the United States Congress: SMITH, John Cotton, (1765 - 1845)
 Biographical Sketch of John Cotton Smith
 
 National Governors Association: Connecticut Governor John Cotton Smith
 Connecticut State Library: John Cotton Smith
 Govtrack.us: Rep. John Cotton Smith
 The Political Graveyard: Smith, John Cotton (1765-1845)

Popular Culture
Henry Russell dedicated the song My Mother's Bible to Gov. Smith.

1765 births
1845 deaths
Members of the Connecticut General Assembly Council of Assistants (1662–1818)
People from Sharon, Connecticut
Governors of Connecticut
Yale College alumni
Speakers of the Connecticut House of Representatives
Federalist Party state governors of the United States
Federalist Party members of the United States House of Representatives from Connecticut
Members of the American Antiquarian Society
Justices of the Connecticut Supreme Court